The EARL is an alternative music venue in Atlanta, Georgia, located on Flat Shoals Avenue in the neighborhood of East Atlanta.

History

The Earl was opened in 1999 by John Searson, a long-time Atlanta resident but a newcomer to the restaurant and live entertainment business. 
The building at 488 Flat Shoals Avenue was being used to store mattresses when Searson signed the lease with the intention of transforming the space into a club and lounge. Much of the business was built by hand, with licensed contractors called in when needed. Even now, the interior of the building reflects Searson's bare-knuckled approach to the business. The bar is made out of a tree which fell on his property while he was building the bar.

At the time, the neighborhood was rapidly gentrifying, but wasn't anywhere near as safe as it is now. The front window had two bullet holes from a scuffle in the street. Searson let a friend sleep in the back to protect the property from any local criminals. The restaurant's opening was a source of intrigue in the neighborhood, with residents pestering Searson to learn when it would be opened. The slow pace of the work prompted him to post a sign on the door saying it would be open when it was open.

Opening night came with the bar already teetering on the edge of bankruptcy. A local distributor had donated three kegs of Pabst Blue Ribbon, but Searson says one of those was consumed before the doors were even open. Yet from the beginning, the restaurant was an improbable success.

List of performers

A partial list of bands and artists that have appeared at the Earl since its opening:

 Active Child
 Agalloch
 Alejandro Escovedo
 American Music Club
 ...And You Will Know Us By The Trail Of Dead
 Aoife O'Donovan
 Anvil
 Art Brut
 Atlas Sound
 Band of Horses
 Beach House
 Ben Kweller
 Ben Lee
 Black Kids
 Black Lips
 Blitzen Trapper
 Bob Mould
 Boris
 Brian Posehn
 Cat Power
 Clap Your Hands Say Yeah
 Clinic
 Cracker
 Daniel Lanois
 David Cross
 Dax Riggs
 Dead Confederate
 Death Cab for Cutie
 Deerhunter
 Deicide
 Dr. Dog
 Drab Majesty
 Earthling
 Eric Bachmann
 Explosions in the Sky
 Girls
 Gogol Bordello
 Grupo Fantasma
 Guitar Wolf
 High on Fire
 Heroine Sheiks
 Holly Golightly
 Iron & Wine
 Isis
 Jay Reatard
 Joanna Newsome
 Jonathan Richman
 King Gizzard & the Lizard Wizard
 Langhorne Slim
 Les Savy Fav
 Liars
 Los Campesinos
 M83
 Magnapop
 Mary Weiss
 Mastodon
 Midlake
 Mike Cooley
 Mike Watt
 Mission of Burma
 Modern English
 Mono
 Mudhoney
 My Morning Jacket
 Neko Case
 Patton Oswalt
 Pedro The Lion
 Peelander-Z
 Pinback
 Polvo
 Raven
 The Rock*A*Teens
 Ronnie Spector
 Shannon Wright
 Shipping News
 Shonen Knife
 Silver Jews
 Sondre Lerche
 Southern Culture on the Skids
 St. Vincent
 Tapes n' Tapes
 Taurus
 Ted Leo and the Pharmacists
 The Avett Brothers
 The Brian Jonestown Massacre
 The Detroit Cobras
 The Dirty Projectors
 The Dodos
 The Hiss
 The Hold Steady
 The Kills
 The Meat Puppets
 The Muffs
 The National
 The Postal Service
 The Queers
 The Reverend Horton Heat
 The Rosebuds
 The Struts
 The Thermals
 The Walkmen
 The Wedding Present
 The Whigs
 Tokyo Police Club
 Tortoise
 Vader
 Vampire Weekend
 Vic Chesnutt
 VNV Nation
 Wayne "The Train" Hancock

Awards
 One of Playboy's 10 best rock clubs in the U.S.
 One of the Wall Street Journal's best hamburgers in the U.S.
 One of Paste Magazine's 40 best music venues in the U.S.
 2005 Best Place to Hear Local Music/Best Rock Club

Notes

External links
 The Earl's website

Music venues in Georgia (U.S. state)